Greyfriars, Gloucester, England, was a medieval monastic house founded about 1231.

In about 1518 a prominent local family, the Berkeleys of Berkeley Castle, paid for the church to be rebuilt in Perpendicular Gothic style. The rest of the friary complex was later demolished.

See also
Blackfriars, Gloucester
Whitefriars, Gloucester

References

External links
Greyfriars, English Heritage

English Heritage sites in Gloucestershire
Monasteries in Gloucestershire
History of Gloucester
Buildings and structures in Gloucester
1231 establishments in England
Christian monasteries established in the 13th century
1538 disestablishments in England